Rodolphus may refer to:
Rodolphus is a Latin form of the name Rudolf
Rodolphus Agricola (1443–1485), humanist scholar
Rodolphus Dickinson (1797–1849), US Representative
R. Holland Duell (1824–1891), United States Representative from New York
Rodolphus de Sancto Trudone, Benedictine abbot
Rodolphus Lestrange, Death Eater from the Harry Potter series